This page is a progressive and labelled list of the SI area orders of magnitude, with certain examples appended to some list objects.

to  square metres

10−8 to 10−1 square metres

100 to 107 square metres

108 to 1014 square metres

1015 to 1026 square metres

1027 square metres and larger

See also
 Orders of magnitude
 List of political and geographic subdivisions by total area

References

Area